Art Contest is the debut full-length album by indie rock band The Like Young.  It was released in 2003 by Parasol Records.

Track listing
"Expensive Tastes"
"Even if It's Getting Late"
"Nice People"
"Looked Up"
"Snobs and Slobs"
"I'm Old Fashioned"
"Leather Jackets"
"The Babes"
"My Problem"
"If Things Loosen Up"
"Be Honest With You"

External links
 Artilysis-List of Ongoing Art Contest.
 [ Allmusic].

2003 albums
The Like Young albums